María Laura Santillan (born 15 March 1962) is an Argentine journalist. She currently hosts "Argentina para armar" at Todo Noticias (TN), Sundays at night and from 2004 until December 2020 she hosted Telenoche, the most viewed news show in Argentina.

References

Argentine journalists
TN (TV channel)
1962 births
Living people